The 2004–05 Oklahoma Sooners men's basketball team represented the University of Oklahoma as a member of the Big 12 Conference during the 2004–05 NCAA Division I men's basketball season. The team was led by head coach Kelvin Sampson and played its home games in the Lloyd Noble Center. Oklahoma finished tied atop the Big 12 regular season standings with Kansas, and OU won the only regular season meeting between the teams. The Sooners fell in the semifinal round of the Big 12 Conference tournament, but received an at-large bid to the NCAA tournament No. 3 seed in the South region. After beating No. 14 seed  in the opening round, the Sooners fell to No. 6 seed Utah in the round of 32 to finish the season 25–8 (12–4 Big 12).

Roster

Schedule and results

|-
! colspan=9 style="background:#960018; color:#FFFDD0;"| Regular season

|-
! colspan=9 style="background:#960018; color:#FFFDD0;"| Big 12 tournament

|-
! colspan=9 style="background:#960018; color:#FFFDD0;"| NCAA tournament

Rankings

References

Oklahoma Sooners men's basketball seasons
Oklahoma
Oklahoma